Raba may refer to:

Places
Rába, a river in Austria and Hungary, tributary of the Danube
Raba (river), a river in Poland, tributary of the Vistula
Raba, Croatia, a village in the municipality of Slivno, Dubrovnik-Neretva County, Croatia
Raba, Indonesia, a town on Sumbawa island, Indonesia

Ethnic groups
Rába Slovenes, an ethnic group living in the Rába Valley in western Hungary
Raba (tribe), a Scheduled Tribe of Meghalaya, India

People
Rabbah bar Nahmani (270–330), known simply as Rabbah, Babylonian rabbi known in the Talmud as an Amora
Rava (amora) (280–352), rabbi and Talmudic scholar
Bob Raba (born 1955), American football player
Ernest A. Raba, American academic administrator
Juan Pablo Raba (born 1977), Colombian actor

Other uses
Rába (company), a Hungarian automaker
Rába (automobile), a car made from 1912 to 1914
Rapid-acting beta2-adrenergic agonist, a class of drug primarily used to treat asthma and other pulmonary disorders
The Redding Area Bus Authority, Shasta County, California

See also
Rabas, a village in the municipality of Valjevo, Serbia
Rabba, a town in Karak Governorate, Jordan